Marco Anthony Archer (born October 11, 1994), better known by his stage name Phora, is an American rapper and former tattoo artist from Anaheim, California. In 2011, he founded his own record label, Yours Truly. His debut studio album, Yours Truly Forever (2017), peaked at number 44 on the Billboard 200 chart.

Early life
Marco Archer was born in Anaheim, California. Before his career in music, he worked as a tattoo artist which proved to be relatively lucrative and aided in the funding of his rap career. In 2011, Marco was nearly stabbed to death in Anaheim, CA just outside of Trident Learning Center, now known as Gilbert High.

He has survived a stabbing and two shootings.

On August 25, 2015, while he was driving on the 210 freeway in Pasadena around 2 a.m., a gray Infiniti sedan pulled up alongside Archer, who was driving home with his then girlfriend, Destiny. Three bullets from a .45 caliber pistol were fired into his back and neck, narrowly missing his vertebra. The crime remains unsolved.

Career
In February 2017, Phora announced signed a major label deal with Warner Bros. Records. So far, Phora has written and released eleven albums, majority of which relates to his past struggles with depression. These include Still a Kid, One Life to Live, Sincerely Yours, Nights Like These, Angels with Broken Wings, With Love, Heartbreak Hotel, and his debut studio album Yours Truly Forever.

In 2018, he released a follow-up to his debut album, titled Love Is Hell. In July 2019, Phora left his record deal with Warner Bros. Records and subsequently released his new album with Emmanuel Mendoza Herrero entitled Bury Me with Dead Roses. In 2020, he released his fourth studio album, With Love 2.

Musical style
Growing up, Archer was strongly influenced by graffiti to make music and influenced by his father to pursue music.

In his song "The World" from his album Angels with Broken Wings (2015), he calls J. Cole, Hopsin, and Logic the only rappers he likes.

His musical style can also be defined by his producer Anthro Beats.

Discography

Studio albums

Mixtapes

EPs

Singles

Guest appearances

Filmography

Music videos

References

External links
 
 
 

Living people
American rappers
Musicians from Anaheim, California
Underground rappers
Alternative hip hop musicians
American tattoo artists
Shooting survivors
Stabbing survivors
1994 births
Stabbing attacks in the United States
21st-century American rappers